Let it Snow Christmas Parade was a parade at Hong Kong Disneyland that replaced Disney on Parade, the park's regular operating parade. The parade itself was essentially the same as Disney on Parade but with new Christmas additions, decorations and replacements. It first ran from 23 November 2007 through 6 January 2008 as part of the A Sparkling Christmas Holiday event. The parade ran for another three years, until the 2010 Christmas season.

References

External links 
 

Let it Snow Christmas Parade
Let it Snow Christmas Parade
Hong Kong Disneyland
Let it Snow Christmas Parade
2007 establishments in Hong Kong
2011 disestablishments in Hong Kong